Richard alias Robert Ruynon or Reynion  (by 1478 – 1521?) of Shepton Mallet and Wells, Somerset, was an English politician.

He was a Member (MP) of the Parliament of England for Wells in 1512 and 1515.

References

15th-century births
1521 deaths
People from Somerset
English MPs 1512–1514
English MPs 1515